Revy Rosalia (born 9 December 1982) is a retired Netherlands Antilles footballer. He is currently working as a youth coach at ADO Den Haag.

Coaching career
After coaching the U15s at VV Dongen and U17/U19s at DHC, he was appointed U-19 manager at Alphense Boys in February 2019.

Ahead of the 2020–21 season, Rosalia was appointed U17 assistant coach at his former club, ADO Den Haag. In the 2021–22 season, he was in charge of the U16s.

References

External links
 Profile at VI

1982 births
Living people
Curaçao footballers
Dutch footballers
Dutch people of Curaçao descent
Footballers from Rotterdam
Dutch Antillean footballers
Netherlands Antilles international footballers
ADO Den Haag players
HFC Haarlem players
TOP Oss players
FC Lienden players
VV Dongen players
DHC Delft players
Association football midfielders